Newsbin Pro is a shareware Usenet newsreader client for Microsoft Windows. It is developed by DJI Interprises

History
When DJI Interprises first published Newsbin Pro in 1995, it was one of the first news clients dedicated to finding and downloading Base64-encoded data in Usenet newsgroups.

Newsbin Pro has been under constant development since its inception, and is an early adopter of Usenet software technologies, such as yEnc encoding, parchives, the NZB file format, and the XFeatures NNTP extension for header compression.

See also
 List of Usenet newsreaders
 Comparison of Usenet newsreaders

References

External links
 
 Newsbin Pro Users Forum

Usenet clients
Shareware